O'Mullod (Gaelic: Ui Bloid) was a sinecure benefice       (Patron: Earl of Egremont) in the Diocese of Killaloe, County Clare, Province of Munster, Ireland.

Notes

Geography of County Clare